Svitlana Samuliak (born 19 July 2003) is a Ukrainian weightlifter. She won the bronze medal in the women's 55kg event at the 2021 World Weightlifting Championships held in Tashkent, Uzbekistan.

Career 

In 2021, she competed in the women's 59 kg event at the Junior World Weightlifting Championships held in Tashkent, Uzbekistan. At the 2021 European Junior & U23 Weightlifting Championships in Rovaniemi, Finland, she won the gold medal in her event.

She won the silver medal in the women's 55 kg event at the 2022 Junior World Weightlifting Championships held in Heraklion, Greece.

Achievements

References

External links 
 

Living people
2003 births
Place of birth missing (living people)
Ukrainian female weightlifters
World Weightlifting Championships medalists
21st-century Ukrainian women